Farah Ejaz Baig is former vice chairperson of Punjab Bar Council. She hails from Multan and she is first woman to be elected to the post.

References

Pakistani lawyers
Pakistani women lawyers
Living people
Year of birth missing (living people)
People from Multan
Vice Chairmen of the Punjab Bar Council